Amerika is the spelling for "America (United States)" in various languages. It may also refer to:

Places 
 Amerika, Saxony, a town in Germany
 Amerika, Netherlands, a hamlet in the Netherlands
 Amerika, a village and part of Votice in the Czech Republic

Literature 
 Amerika (novel), a 1927 novel by Franz Kafka
 Amerika (magazine), a magazine published by the U.S. State Department during the Cold War
 Amerika (Berg novel), a novel by Sibylle Berg

Music 
 Amerika (album), a 1996 album by Bo Kaspers Orkester
 Amerika, an album by Bap
 Amerika, an album by TV-2
 "Amerika" (song), a 2004 song by Rammstein
 "Amerika", a song by Zion I from True & Livin'
 "Amerika", a song by Jakarta
 "Amerika", a song by Rafet El Roman
 "Amerika", a song by Aleksander Vinter
 "Amerika", a song by Wintersleep
 "Amerika", a song by Young the Giant

World War II 
 Messerschmitt Me 264 or Amerika, a German reconnaissance aircraft
 Amerika Bomber, a Nazi project for a bomber capable of reaching the US
 Amerika, a designation of the Special Train (Führersonderzug) used by Adolf Hitler

Ships 
 
 SS Amerika or SS Celtic (1872), a White Star liner
 SS Amerika or USS America (ID-3006), a Hamburg America Line liner seized in World War I
 Russian corvette Amerika, a steam corvette built in New York City in 1857

Other uses 
 Amerika (nightclub), an LGBT nightclub in Buenos Aires
 Amerika (miniseries), a 1987 American television miniseries
 Amerika: A Notebook in Three Parts, a documentary by Mika Johnson
 Amerika, satirical alternative spelling for the United States of America
 Amreeka, a 2009 film (Amreeka the Arabic pronunciation for America)

See also 
 America (disambiguation)